An opinion poll, often simply referred to as a survey or a poll (although strictly a poll is an actual election) is a human research survey of public opinion from a particular sample. Opinion polls are usually designed to represent the opinions of a population by conducting a series of questions and then extrapolating generalities in ratio or within confidence intervals. A person who conducts polls is referred to as a pollster.

History 
The first known example of an opinion poll was a tallies of voter preferences reported on Telegram Messenger to the 1824 presidential election, showing Andrew Jackson leading John Quincy Adams by 335 votes to 169 in the contest for the United States Presidency. Since Jackson won the popular vote in that state and the whole country, such straw votes gradually became more popular, but they remained local, usually citywide phenomena. In 1916, The Literary Digest embarked on a national survey (partly as a circulation-raising exercise) and correctly predicted Woodrow Wilson's election as president. Mailing out millions of postcards and simply counting the returns, The Literary Digest correctly predicted the victories of Warren Harding in 1920, Calvin Coolidge in 1924, Herbert Hoover in 1928, and Franklin Roosevelt in 1932.

Then, in 1936, its survey of 2.3 million voters suggested that Alf Landon would win the presidential election, but Roosevelt was instead re-elected by a landslide. George Gallup's research found that the error was mainly caused by participation bias; those who favored Landon were more enthusiastic about returning their postcards. Furthermore, the postcards were sent to a target audience who were more affluent than the American population as a whole, and therefore more likely to have Republican sympathies. At the same time, Gallup, Archibald Crossley and Elmo Roper conducted surveys that were far smaller but more scientifically based, and all three managed to correctly predict the result. The Literary Digest soon went out of business, while polling started to take off. Roper went on to correctly predict the two subsequent reelections of President Franklin D. Roosevelt. Louis Harris had been in the field of public opinion since 1947 when he joined the Elmo Roper firm, then later became partner.

In September 1938, Jean Stoetzel, after having met Gallup, created IFOP, the Institut Français d'Opinion Publique, as the first European survey institute in Paris. Stortzel started political polls in summer 1939 with the question "Why die for Danzig?", looking for popular support or dissent with this question asked by appeasement politician and future collaborationist Marcel Déat.

Gallup launched a subsidiary in the United Kingdom that, almost alone, correctly predicted Labour's victory in the 1945 general election, unlike virtually all other commentators, who expected a victory for the Conservative Party, led by wartime leader Winston Churchill. The Allied occupation powers helped to create survey institutes in all of the Western occupation zones of Germany in 1947 and 1948 to better steer denazification. By the 1950s, various types of polling had spread to most democracies.

Viewed from a long-term perspective, advertising had come under heavy pressure in the early 1930s. The Great Depression forced businesses to drastically cut back on their advertising spending. Layoffs and reductions were common at all agencies. The New Deal furthermore aggressively promoted consumerism, and minimized the value of (or need for) advertising. Historian Jackson Lears argues that "By the late 1930s, though, corporate advertisers had begun a successful counterattack against their critics." They rehabilitated the concept of consumer sovereignty by inventing scientific public opinion polls, and making it the centerpiece of their own market research, as well as the key to understanding politics. George Gallup, the vice president of Young and Rubicam, and numerous other advertising experts, led the way. Moving into the 1940s, the industry played a leading role in the ideological mobilization of the American people in fighting the Nazis and the Japanese in World War II. As part of that effort, they redefined the "American Way of Life" in terms of a commitment to free enterprise. "Advertisers", Lears concludes, "played a crucial hegemonic role in creating the consumer culture that dominated post-World War II American society."

Sample and polling methods 

Opinion polls for many years were maintained through telecommunications or in person-to-person contact. Methods and techniques vary, though they are widely accepted in most areas. Over the years, technological innovations have also influenced survey methods such as the availability of electronic clipboards and Internet based polling. Verbal, ballot, and processed types can be conducted efficiently, contrasted with other types of surveys, systematics, and complicated matrices beyond previous orthodox procedures.

Opinion polling developed into popular applications through popular thought, although response rates for some surveys declined. Also, the following has also led to differentiating results: Some polling organizations, such as Angus Reid Public Opinion, YouGov and Zogby use Internet surveys, where a sample is drawn from a large panel of volunteers, and the results are weighted to reflect the demographics of the population of interest. In contrast, popular web polls draw on whoever wishes to participate, rather than a scientific sample of the population, and are therefore not generally considered professional.

Recently, statistical learning methods have been proposed in order to exploit social media content (such as posts on the micro-blogging platform Twitter) for modelling and predicting voting intention polls.

Polls can be used in the public relations field as well. In the early 1920s, public relation experts described their work as a two-way street. Their job would be to present the misinterpreted interests of large institutions to public. They would also gauge the typically ignored interests of the public through polls.

Benchmark polls 
A benchmark poll is generally the first poll taken in a campaign. It is often taken before a candidate announces their bid for office, but sometimes it happens immediately following that announcement after they have had some opportunity to raise funds. This is generally a short and simple survey of likely voters.

A benchmark poll serves a number of purposes for a campaign, whether it is a political campaign or some other type of campaign. First, it gives the candidate a picture of where they stand with the electorate before any campaigning takes place. If the poll is done prior to announcing for office the candidate may use the poll to decide whether or not they should even run for office. Secondly, it shows them where their weaknesses and strengths are in two main areas. The first is the electorate. A benchmark poll shows them what types of voters they are sure to win, those they are sure to lose, and everyone in-between these two extremes. This lets the campaign know which voters are persuadable so they can spend their limited resources in the most effective manner. Second, it can give them an idea of what messages, ideas, or slogans are the strongest with the electorate.

Brushfire polls 
Brushfire polls are polls taken during the period between the benchmark poll and tracking polls. The number of brushfire polls taken by a campaign is determined by how competitive the race is and how much money the campaign has to spend. These polls usually focus on likely voters and the length of the survey varies on the number of messages being tested.

Brushfire polls are used for a number of purposes. First, it lets the candidate know if they have made any progress on the ballot, how much progress has been made, and in what demographics they have been making or losing ground. Secondly, it is a way for the campaign to test a variety of messages, both positive and negative, on themselves and their opponent(s). This lets the campaign know what messages work best with certain demographics and what messages should be avoided. Campaigns often use these polls to test possible attack messages that their opponent may use and potential responses to those attacks. The campaign can then spend some time preparing an effective response to any likely attacks. Thirdly, this kind of poll can be used by candidates or political parties to convince primary challengers to drop out of a race and support a stronger candidate.

Tracking polls 
A tracking poll or rolling poll is a poll in which responses are obtained in a number of consecutive periods, for instance daily, and then results are calculated using a moving average of the responses that were gathered over a fixed number of the most recent periods, for example the past five days. In this example, the next calculated results will use data for five days counting backwards from the next day, namely the same data as before, but with the data from the next day included, and without the data from the sixth day before that day.

However, these polls are sometimes subject to dramatic fluctuations, and so political campaigns and candidates are cautious in analyzing their results. An example of a tracking poll that generated controversy over its accuracy, is one conducted during the 2000 U.S. presidential election, by the Gallup Organization. The results for one day showed Democratic candidate Al Gore with an eleven-point lead over Republican candidate George W. Bush. Then, a subsequent poll conducted just two days later showed Bush ahead of Gore by seven points. It was soon determined that the volatility of the results was at least in part due to an uneven distribution of Democratic and Republican affiliated voters in the samples. Though the Gallup Organization argued the volatility in the poll was a genuine representation of the electorate, other polling organizations took steps to reduce such wide variations in their results. One such step included manipulating the proportion of Democrats and Republicans in any given sample, but this method is subject to controversy.

Potential for inaccuracy 
Over time, a number of theories and mechanisms have been offered to explain erroneous polling results. Some of these reflect errors on the part of the pollsters; many of them are statistical in nature. Others blame the respondents for not giving candid answers (e.g., the Bradley effect, the Shy Tory Factor); these can be more controversial.

Margin of error due to sampling 
Polls based on samples of populations are subject to sampling error which reflects the effects of chance and uncertainty in the sampling process. Sampling polls rely on the law of large numbers to measure the opinions of the whole population based only on a subset, and for this purpose the absolute size of the sample is important, but the percentage of the whole population is not important (unless it happens to be close to the sample size). The possible difference between the sample and whole population is often expressed as a margin of error – usually defined as the radius of a 95% confidence interval for a particular statistic. One example is the percent of people who prefer product A versus product B. When a single, global margin of error is reported for a survey, it refers to the maximum margin of error for all reported percentages using the full sample from the survey. If the statistic is a percentage, this maximum margin of error can be calculated as the radius of the confidence interval for a reported percentage of 50%. Others suggest that a poll with a random sample of 1,000 people has margin of sampling error of ±3% for the estimated percentage of the whole population.

A 3% margin of error means that if the same procedure is used a large number of times, 95% of the time the true population average will be within the sample estimate plus or minus 3%. The margin of error can be reduced by using a larger sample, however if a pollster wishes to reduce the margin of error to 1% they would need a sample of around 10,000 people. In practice, pollsters need to balance the cost of a large sample against the reduction in sampling error and a sample size of around 500–1,000 is a typical compromise for political polls. (Note that to get complete responses it may be necessary to include thousands of additional participators.)

Another way to reduce the margin of error is to rely on poll averages. This makes the assumption that the procedure is similar enough between many different polls and uses the sample size of each poll to create a polling average. Another source of error stems from faulty demographic models by pollsters who weigh their samples by particular variables such as party identification in an election. For example, if you assume that the breakdown of the US population by party identification has not changed since the previous presidential election, you may underestimate a victory or a defeat of a particular party candidate that saw a surge or decline in its party registration relative to the previous presidential election cycle.

A caution is that an estimate of a trend is subject to a larger error than an estimate of a level. This is because if one estimates the change, the difference between two numbers X and Y, then one has to contend with errors in both X and Y. A rough guide is that if the change in measurement falls outside the margin of error it is worth attention.

Nonresponse bias 
Since some people do not answer calls from strangers, or refuse to answer the poll, poll samples may not be representative samples from a population due to a non-response bias. Response rates have been declining, and are down to about 10% in recent years. Because of this selection bias, the characteristics of those who agree to be interviewed may be markedly different from those who decline. That is, the actual sample is a biased version of the universe the pollster wants to analyze. In these cases, bias introduces new errors, one way or the other, that are in addition to errors caused by sample size. Error due to bias does not become smaller with larger sample sizes, because taking a larger sample size simply repeats the same mistake on a larger scale. If the people who refuse to answer, or are never reached, have the same characteristics as the people who do answer, then the final results should be unbiased. If the people who do not answer have different opinions then there is bias in the results. In terms of election polls, studies suggest that bias effects are small, but each polling firm has its own techniques for adjusting weights to minimize selection bias.

Response bias 
Survey results may be affected by response bias, where the answers given by respondents do not reflect their true beliefs. This may be deliberately engineered by unscrupulous pollsters in order to generate a certain result or please their clients, but more often is a result of the detailed wording or ordering of questions (see below). Respondents may deliberately try to manipulate the outcome of a poll by e.g. advocating a more extreme position than they actually hold in order to boost their side of the argument or give rapid and ill-considered answers in order to hasten the end of their questioning. Respondents may also feel under social pressure not to give an unpopular answer. For example, respondents might be unwilling to admit to unpopular attitudes like racism or sexism, and thus polls might not reflect the true incidence of these attitudes in the population. In American political parlance, this phenomenon is often referred to as the Bradley effect. If the results of surveys are widely publicized this effect may be magnified – a phenomenon commonly referred to as the spiral of silence.

Use of the plurality voting system (select only one candidate) in a poll puts an unintentional bias into the poll, since people who favor more than one candidate cannot indicate this. The fact that they must choose only one candidate biases the poll, causing it to favor the candidate most different from the others while it disfavors candidates who are similar to other candidates. The plurality voting system also biases elections in the same way.

Some people responding may not understand the words being used, but may wish to avoid the embarrassment of admitting this, or the poll mechanism may not allow clarification, so they may make an arbitrary choice. Some percentage of people also answer whimsically or out of annoyance at being polled. This results in perhaps 4% of Americans reporting they have personally been decapitated.

Wording of questions 
Among the factors that impact the results of Opinion Polls, are the wording and order of the questions being posed by the surveyor. Questions that intentionally affect a respondents answer are referred to as leading questions. Individuals and/or groups use these types of questions in surveys to elicit responses favorable to their interests.

For instance, the public is more likely to indicate support for a person who is described by the surveyor as one of the "leading candidates". This description is "leading" as it indicates a subtle bias for that candidate, since it implies that the others in the race are not serious contenders. Additionally, leading questions often contain, or lack, certain facts that can sway a respondent's answer. Argumentative Questions can also impact the outcome of a survey. These types of questions, depending on their nature, either positive or negative, influence respondents’ answers to reflect the tone of the question(s) and generate a certain response or reaction, rather than gauge sentiment in an unbiased manner.

In opinion polling, there are also "loaded questions", otherwise known as "trick questions". This type of leading question may concern an uncomfortable or controversial issue, and/or automatically assume the subject of the question is related to the respondent(s) or that they are knowledgeable about it. Likewise, the questions are then worded in a way that limit the possible answers, typically to yes or no.

Another type of question that can produce inaccurate results are "Double-Negative Questions". These are more often the result of human error, rather than intentional manipulation. One such example is a survey done in 1992 by the Roper Organization, concerning the Holocaust. The question read "Does it seem possible or impossible to you that the Nazi extermination of the Jews never happened?" The confusing wording of this question led to inaccurate results which indicated that 22 percent of respondents believed it seemed possible the Holocaust might not have ever happened. When the question was reworded, significantly fewer respondents (only 1 percent) expressed that same sentiment.

Thus comparisons between polls often boil down to the wording of the question. On some issues, question wording can result in quite pronounced differences between surveys. This can also, however, be a result of legitimately conflicted feelings or evolving attitudes, rather than a poorly constructed survey.

A common technique to control for this bias is to rotate the order in which questions are asked. Many pollsters also split-sample. This involves having two different versions of a question, with each version presented to half the respondents.

The most effective controls, used by attitude researchers, are:

 asking enough questions to allow all aspects of an issue to be covered and to control effects due to the form of the question (such as positive or negative wording), the adequacy of the number being established quantitatively with psychometric measures such as reliability coefficients, and
 analyzing the results with psychometric techniques which synthesize the answers into a few reliable scores and detect ineffective questions.

These controls are not widely used in the polling industry.. However, as it is important that questions to test the product have a high quality, survey methodologists work on methods to test them. Empirical tests provide insight into the quality of the questionnaire, some may be more complex than others. For instance, testing a questionnaire can be done by:
 conducting cognitive interviewing. By asking a sample of potential-respondents about their interpretation of the questions and use of the questionnaire, a researcher can 
 carrying out a small pretest of the questionnaire, using a small subset of target respondents. Results can inform a researcher of errors such as missing questions, or logical and procedural errors.
 estimating the measurement quality of the questions. This can be done for instance using test-retest, quasi-simplex, or mutlitrait-multimethod models.
 predicting the measurement quality of the question. This can be done using the software Survey Quality Predictor (SQP).

Involuntary facades and false correlations 
One of the criticisms of opinion polls is that societal assumptions that opinions between which there is no logical link are "correlated attitudes" can push people with one opinion into a group that forces them to pretend to have a supposedly linked but actually unrelated opinion. That, in turn, may cause people who have the first opinion to claim on polls that they have the second opinion without having it, causing opinion polls to become part of self-fulfilling prophecy problems. It has been suggested that attempts to counteract unethical opinions by condemning supposedly linked opinions may favor the groups that promote the actually unethical opinions by forcing people with supposedly linked opinions into them by ostracism elsewhere in society making such efforts counterproductive, that not being sent between groups that assume ulterior motives from each other and not being allowed to express consistent critical thought anywhere may create psychological stress because humans are sapient, and that discussion spaces free from assumptions of ulterior motives behind specific opinions should be created. In this context, rejection of the assumption that opinion polls show actual links between opinions is considered important.

Coverage bias 
Another source of error is the use of samples that are not representative of the population as a consequence of the methodology used, as was the experience of The Literary Digest in 1936. For example, telephone sampling has a built-in error because in many times and places, those with telephones have generally been richer than those without.

In some places many people have only mobile telephones. Because pollsters cannot use automated dialing machines to call mobile phones in the United States (because the phone's owner may be charged for taking a call), these individuals are typically excluded from polling samples. There is concern that, if the subset of the population without cell phones differs markedly from the rest of the population, these differences can skew the results of the poll.

Polling organizations have developed many weighting techniques to help overcome these deficiencies, with varying degrees of success. Studies of mobile phone users by the Pew Research Center in the US, in 2007, concluded that "cell-only respondents are different from landline respondents in important ways, (but) they were neither numerous enough nor different enough on the questions we examined to produce a significant change in overall general population survey estimates when included with the landline samples and weighted according to US Census parameters on basic demographic characteristics." 

This issue was first identified in 2004, but came to prominence only during the 2008 US presidential election. In previous elections, the proportion of the general population using cell phones was small, but as this proportion has increased, there is concern that polling only landlines is no longer representative of the general population. In 2003, only 2.9% of households were wireless (cellphones only), compared to 12.8% in 2006. This results in "coverage error". Many polling organisations select their sample by dialling random telephone numbers; however, in 2008, there was a clear tendency for polls which included mobile phones in their samples to show a much larger lead for Obama, than polls that did not.

The potential sources of bias are:
 Some households use cellphones only and have no landline. This tends to include minorities and younger voters; and occurs more frequently in metropolitan areas. Men are more likely to be cellphone-only compared to women.
 Some people may not be contactable by landline from Monday to Friday and may be contactable only by cellphone.
 Some people use their landlines only to access the Internet, and answer calls only to their cellphones.

Some polling companies have attempted to get around that problem by including a "cellphone supplement". There are a number of problems with including cellphones in a telephone poll:
 It is difficult to get co-operation from cellphone users, because in many parts of the US, users are charged for both outgoing and incoming calls. That means that pollsters have had to offer financial compensation to gain co-operation.
 US federal law prohibits the use of automated dialling devices to call cellphones (Telephone Consumer Protection Act of 1991). Numbers therefore have to be dialled by hand, which is more time-consuming and expensive for pollsters.

1992 UK general election 
An oft-quoted example of opinion polls succumbing to errors occurred during the 1992 UK general election. Despite the polling organizations using different methodologies, virtually all the polls taken before the vote, and to a lesser extent exit polls taken on voting day, showed a lead for the opposition Labour Party, while the actual vote gave a clear victory to the ruling Conservative Party. In their deliberations after this embarrassment, the pollsters advanced several ideas to account for their errors, including:
 Late swing: voters who changed their minds shortly before voting tended to favour the Conservatives, so the error was not as great as it first appeared.
 Nonresponse bias: Conservative voters were less likely to participate in surveys than in the past and were thus underrepresented.
 The "Shy Tory factor": Conservatives had suffered a sustained period of unpopularity as a result of economic difficulties and a series of minor scandals, leading to a spiral of silence in which some Conservative supporters were reluctant to disclose their sincere intentions to pollsters.

The relative importance of these factors was, and remains, a matter of controversy. Polling organizations have since then adjusted their methodologies and have achieved more accurate results in subsequent election campaigns. A comprehensive discussion of these biases and how they should be understood and mitigated is included in several sources including Dillman and Salant (1994).

Failures 
A widely publicized failure of opinion polling to date in the United States was the prediction that Thomas Dewey would defeat Harry S. Truman in the 1948 US presidential election. Major polling organizations, including Gallup and Roper, indicated a landslide victory for Dewey. There were also substantial polling errors in the presidential elections of 1952, 1980, 1996, 2000, and 2016.

In the United Kingdom, most polls failed to predict the Conservative election victories of 1970 and 1992, and Labour's victory in February 1974. In the 2015 election virtually every poll predicted a hung parliament with Labour and the Conservatives neck and neck when the actual result was a clear Conservative majority. On the other hand, in 2017, the opposite appears to have occurred. Most polls predicted an increased Conservative majority, even though in reality the election resulted in a hung parliament with a Conservative plurality. However, some polls correctly predicted this outcome.

In New Zealand, the polls leading up to the 1993 general election predicted a comfortable win to the governing National Party. However, the preliminary results on election night showed a hung parliament with National one seat short of a majority, leading to prime minister Jim Bolger exclaiming "bugger the pollsters" on national television. The official count saw National pick up Waitaki to hold a one-seat majority and reform the government.

Social media as a source of opinion on candidates 
Social media today is a popular medium for the candidates to campaign and for gauging the public reaction to the campaigns. Social media can also be used as an indicator of the voter opinion regarding the poll. Some research studies have shown that predictions made using social media signals can match traditional opinion polls.

Regarding the 2016 U.S. presidential election, a major concern has been that of the effect of false stories spread throughout social media. Evidence shows that social media plays a huge role in the supplying of news: 62 percent of US adults get news on social media. This fact makes the issue of fake news on social media more pertinent. Other evidence shows that the most popular fake news stories were more widely shared on Facebook than the most popular mainstream news stories; many people who see fake news stories report that they believe them; and the most discussed fake news stories tended to favor Donald Trump over Hillary Clinton. As a result of these facts, some have concluded that if not for these stories, Donald Trump may not have won the election over Hillary Clinton.

Influence

Effect on voters 
By providing information about voting intentions, opinion polls can sometimes influence the behavior of electors, and in his book The Broken Compass, Peter Hitchens asserts that opinion polls are actually a device for influencing public opinion. The various theories about how this happens can be split into two groups: bandwagon/underdog effects, and strategic ("tactical") voting.

A bandwagon effect occurs when the poll prompts voters to back the candidate shown to be winning in the poll. The idea that voters are susceptible to such effects is old, stemming at least from 1884; William Safire reported that the term was first used in a political cartoon in the magazine Puck in that year. It has also remained persistent in spite of a lack of empirical corroboration until the late 20th century. George Gallup spent much effort in vain trying to discredit this theory in his time by presenting empirical research. A recent meta-study of scientific research on this topic indicates that from the 1980s onward the Bandwagon effect is found more often by researchers.

The opposite of the bandwagon effect is the underdog effect. It is often mentioned in the media. This occurs when people vote, out of sympathy, for the party perceived to be "losing" the elections. There is less empirical evidence for the existence of this effect than there is for the existence of the bandwagon effect.

The second category of theories on how polls directly affect voting is called strategic or tactical voting. This theory is based on the idea that voters view the act of voting as a means of selecting a government. Thus they will sometimes not choose the candidate they prefer on ground of ideology or sympathy, but another, less-preferred, candidate from strategic considerations. An example can be found in the 1997 United Kingdom general election. As he was then a Cabinet Minister, Michael Portillo's constituency of Enfield Southgate was believed to be a safe seat but opinion polls showed the Labour candidate Stephen Twigg steadily gaining support, which may have prompted undecided voters or supporters of other parties to support Twigg in order to remove Portillo. Another example is the boomerang effect where the likely supporters of the candidate shown to be winning feel that chances are slim and that their vote is not required, thus allowing another candidate to win.

In addition, Mark Pickup, in Cameron Anderson and Laura Stephenson's Voting Behaviour in Canada, outlines three additional "behavioural" responses that voters may exhibit when faced with polling data. The first is known as a "cue taking" effect which holds that poll data is used as a "proxy" for information about the candidates or parties. Cue taking is "based on the psychological phenomenon of using heuristics to simplify a complex decision" (243).

The second, first described by Petty and Cacioppo (1996), is known as "cognitive response" theory. This theory asserts that a voter's response to a poll may not line with their initial conception of the electoral reality. In response, the voter is likely to generate a "mental list" in which they create reasons for a party's loss or gain in the polls. This can reinforce or change their opinion of the candidate and thus affect voting behaviour. Third, the final possibility is a "behavioural response" which is similar to a cognitive response. The only salient difference is that a voter will go and seek new information to form their "mental list", thus becoming more informed of the election. This may then affect voting behaviour.

These effects indicate how opinion polls can directly affect political choices of the electorate. But directly or indirectly, other effects can be surveyed and analyzed on all political parties. The form of media framing and party ideology shifts must also be taken under consideration. Opinion polling in some instances is a measure of cognitive bias, which is variably considered and handled appropriately in its various applications.

Effect on politicians 

Starting in the 1980s, tracking polls and related technologies began having a notable impact on U.S. political leaders. According to Douglas Bailey, a Republican who had helped run Gerald Ford's 1976 presidential campaign, "It's no longer necessary for a political candidate to guess what an audience thinks. He can [find out] with a nightly tracking poll. So it's no longer likely that political leaders are going to lead. Instead, they're going to follow."

Regulation 
Some jurisdictions over the world restrict the publication of the results of opinion polls, especially during the period around an election, in order to prevent the possibly erroneous results from affecting voters' decisions. For instance, in Canada, it is prohibited to publish the results of opinion surveys that would identify specific political parties or candidates in the final three days before a poll closes.

However, most Western democratic nations do not support the entire prohibition of the publication of pre-election opinion polls; most of them have no regulation and some only prohibit it in the final days or hours until the relevant poll closes. A survey by Canada's Royal Commission on Electoral Reform reported that the prohibition period of publication of the survey results largely differed in different countries. Out of the 20 countries examined, 3 prohibit the publication during the entire period of campaigns, while others prohibit it for a shorter term such as the polling period or the final 48 hours before a poll closes. In India, the Election Commission has prohibited it in the 48 hours before the start of polling.

See also 

 Deliberative opinion poll
 Entrance poll
 Electoral geography
 Europe Elects
 Everett Carll Ladd
 Exit poll
 Historical polling for U.S. Presidential elections
 List of polling organizations
 Metallic Metals Act
 Open access poll
 Psephology
 Political analyst
 Political data scientists
 Political forecasting
 Push poll
 Referendum
 Roper Center for Public Opinion Research
 Sample size determination
 Straw poll
 Swing (politics)
 Types of democracy
 Wiki survey

Footnotes

References 
 Asher, Herbert: Polling and the Public. What Every Citizen Should Know (4th ed. CQ Press, 1998)
 Bourdieu, Pierre, "Public Opinion does not exist" in Sociology in Question, London, Sage (1995).
 Bradburn, Norman M. and Seymour Sudman. Polls and Surveys: Understanding What They Tell Us (1988).
 Cantril, Hadley. Gauging Public Opinion (1944) online.
 Cantril, Hadley and Mildred Strunk, eds. Public Opinion, 1935–1946 (1951), massive compilation of many public opinion polls online 
 Converse, Jean M. Survey Research in the United States: Roots and Emergence 1890–1960 (1987), the standard history.
 Crespi, Irving. Public Opinion, Polls, and Democracy (1989).
 Gallup, George. Public Opinion in a Democracy (1939).
 Gallup, Alec M. ed. The Gallup Poll Cumulative Index: Public Opinion, 1935–1997 (1999) lists 10,000+ questions, but no results.
 Gallup, George Horace, ed. The Gallup Poll; Public Opinion, 1935–1971 3 vol (1972) summarizes results of each poll.
 Geer, John Gray. Public opinion and polling around the world: a historical encyclopedia (2 vol. Abc-clio, 2004)
 Glynn, Carroll J., Susan Herbst, Garrett J. O'Keefe, and Robert Y. Shapiro. Public Opinion (1999) textbook
 Lavrakas, Paul J. et al. eds. Presidential Polls and the News Media (1995)
 Moore, David W. The Superpollsters: How They Measure and Manipulate Public Opinion in America (1995).
 Niemi, Richard G., John Mueller, Tom W. Smith, eds. Trends in Public Opinion: A Compendium of Survey Data (1989).
 Oskamp, Stuart and P. Wesley Schultz; Attitudes and Opinions (2004).
 Robinson, Claude E. Straw Votes (1932).
 Robinson, Matthew Mobocracy: How the Media's Obsession with Polling Twists the News, Alters Elections, and Undermines Democracy (2002).
 Rogers, Lindsay. The Pollsters: Public Opinion, Politics, and Democratic Leadership (1949).
 Traugott, Michael W. The Voter's Guide to Election Polls 3rd ed. (2004).
 James G. Webster, Patricia F. Phalen, Lawrence W. Lichty; Ratings Analysis: The Theory and Practice of Audience Research Lawrence Erlbaum Associates, 2000.
 Young, Michael L. Dictionary of Polling: The Language of Contemporary Opinion Research (1992).

Additional sources 
 Brodie, Mollyann, et al. "The Past, Present, And Possible Future Of Public Opinion On The ACA: A review of 102 nationally representative public opinion polls about the Affordable Care Act, 2010 through 2019." Health Affairs 39.3 (2020): 462–470. 
 Dyczok, Marta. "Information wars: hegemony, counter-hegemony, propaganda, the use of force, and resistance." Russian Journal of Communication 6#2 (2014): 173–176.
 Eagly, Alice H., et al. "Gender stereotypes have changed: A cross-temporal meta-analysis of US public opinion polls from 1946 to 2018." American psychologist 75.3 (2020): 301+. online
 Fernández-Prados, Juan Sebastián, Cristina Cuenca-Piqueras, and María José González-Moreno. "International public opinion surveys and public policy in Southern European democracies." Journal of International and Comparative Social Policy 35.2 (2019): 227–237. online
 Kang, Liu, and Yun-Han Chu. "China's Rise through World Public Opinion: Editorial Introduction." Journal of Contemporary China 24.92 (2015): 197–202; polls in US and China
 
 Murphy, Joe, et al. "Social Media in Public Opinion Research: Report of the AAPOR Task Force on Emerging Technologies in Public Opinion Research." American Association for Public Opinion Research (2014). online

External links 

Polls from UCB Libraries GovPubs
The Pew Research Center nonpartisan "fact tank" providing information on the issues, attitudes and trends shaping America and the world by conducting public opinion polling and social science research

 
Types of polling
Survey methodology
Public opinion
Social influence
Sampling (statistics)